John L. Nickels (January 16, 1931 – June 24, 2013) was an American jurist.

Born in Aurora, Illinois, Nickels served in the United States Army in 1954. He received his bachelor's degree from Northern Illinois University and studied at Northwestern University. He then received his law degree from DePaul University College of Law and practiced law. He served as an Illinois Circuit Court judge in 1982 and then as an Illinois Appellate Court judge in 1990. From 1992 to 1998, he served as an Illinois Supreme Court justice. He died in Maple Park, Illinois, where he had lived on his farm.

Notes

1931 births
2013 deaths
People from Aurora, Illinois
People from Maple Park, Illinois
Military personnel from Illinois
Farmers from Illinois
Northern Illinois University alumni
Northwestern University alumni
DePaul University College of Law alumni
Judges of the Illinois Appellate Court
Justices of the Illinois Supreme Court
20th-century American judges